is an officially commissioned Japanese history text. Completed in 869, it is the fourth volume in the Six National Histories. It covers the years 833–850.

Background

Following the earlier national history Nihon Kōki (840), in 855 Emperor Montoku ordered the compilation of the years since then. Primarily edited by Fujiwara no Yoshifusa and Haruzumi no Yoshitsuna, the text was completed in 869.

Contents

Written in Kanbun-style and contained within 20 volumes, the contents covered 18 years spanning 833 and 850. As opposed to the previous national histories, it is the first to cover a single reign, that of Emperor Ninmyō setting the model for future national histories.

See also

 Ruijū Kokushi, a categorized and chronological history text of the Six National Histories; valuable resource in recreating lost contents of the Shoku Nihon Kōki

References

External links
Text of the Shoku Nihon Kōki (Japanese)
Manuscript scans, Waseda University Library: manuscript 1, 2

Late Old Japanese texts
9th-century history books
History books about Japan
Heian period in literature
9th-century Japanese books
History books of the Heian Period